Rosa komarovii is a species of rose that was described by Dmitrii Ivanovich Sosnowsky. Rosa komarovii is part of the genus Roses, and the family Rosaceae.

References 

Plants described in 1944
komarovii